Shire Airport, also known as Shire Inda Selassie Airport or Indaselassie Airport,  is an airport serving Shire, a city in the Tigray National Regional State of Ethiopia. The airport is just south of the city.

Shire Airport was constructed by Ethiopian Construction Works Corporation, Transport Infrastructure Construction Sector. The project was signed to construct in 2015 and completed in 2017. The project included airport runway, apron, and taxiway, as well as a road running from Shire city to the airport.

Airlines and destinations

See also
Transport in Ethiopia
List of airports in Ethiopia

References

External links
OpenStreetMap - Shire General Hayelyom Araya Airport
FallingRain - Shire Inda Selassie Airport
OurAirports - Shire Inda Selassie Airport

Airports in Ethiopia
Tigray Region